Rineloricaria daraha is a species of catfish in the family Loricariidae. It is native to South America, where it was originally known only from cataracts of the Daraá River in the state of Amazonas in Brazil. In 2016, the species was also found in the Paca River, a tributary of the Rio Negro, in Colombia, extending its known distribution. The species reaches 20.1 cm (7.9 inches) in standard length and is believed to be a facultative air-breather.

References 

Loricariidae
Fish described in 2008
Catfish of South America
Fish of Brazil